Saga of Old City is a 1985 fantasy novel by Gary Gygax, set in the world of Greyhawk, which is based on the Dungeons & Dragons fantasy role-playing game.

Plot summary
Saga of Old City was the first novel to feature Gord the Rogue.  Saga of Old City starts in Gord's childhood, and ends with his triumphant return to Greyhawk City as a young man and master thief. He learns his trade in the 'beggars' guild', and gets involved in the gang war touched off by the beggars encroaching on the official thieves' guild's territory. He travels and has a variety of swashbuckling adventures, ranging from participating in a war, to liberating a young noblewoman held hostage, to defeating a demon with a druid, Curley Greenleaf, and a barbarian, Chert.

Publication history
Gary Gygax wrote a short story, "At Moonset Blackcat Comes", that appeared in the special 100th issue of Dragon in August 1985.  This introduced Gord the Rogue to gamers just before Saga of Old City was scheduled to be released. Saga of the Old City was published in 1985; this and its sequel Artifact of Evil were the only two novels published under TSR's Greyhawk Adventures written by Gygax.

This was Gygax's first novel, and it was edited by Kim Mohan. It was the first Greyhawk novel released by TSR. It was not the first published novel to take place in this world; the first novel to feature Greyhawk was Quag Keep, published in 1978 by Andre Norton.

In 2008 Troll Lord Games released a new hard cover reprinting of Saga of Old City.

Reception
In the Io9 series revisiting older Dungeons & Dragons novels, Rob Bricken commented that "I feel very weird about hating a novel written by the father of Dungeons & Dragons, but there's nothing fantastic about the fantasy in Saga of Old City. It's just deeply, deeply unpleasant. So while I might give the technical writing a 4 on a 1d20—he's more competent at scene and actions descriptions than R.A. Salvatore in The Crystal Shard, at least Salvatore's characters were distinct and memorable—but a penalty of -2, along with a -3 for its outright misogyny. In the end, that leaves Saga of Old City with -1—technically not a critical miss, but still an utter failure."

References

1985 American novels
American fantasy novels
Books by Gary Gygax
Greyhawk novels